K. Alaguvelu is an Indian politician and was a member of the 14th Tamil Nadu Legislative Assembly from the Kallakurichi constituency, which is reserved for Scheduled Castes. She represented the All India Anna Dravida Munnetra Kazhagam party.

The elections of 2016 resulted in her constituency being won by A. Prabhu.

References 

Tamil Nadu MLAs 2011–2016
All India Anna Dravida Munnetra Kazhagam politicians
Living people
21st-century Indian women politicians
21st-century Indian politicians
Year of birth missing (living people)
Tamil Nadu politicians
Women members of the Tamil Nadu Legislative Assembly